The Australian and New Zealand Society of Indexers (ANZSI) is a society representing indexers in Australia and New Zealand. It has branches and groups in ACT, New South Wales, New Zealand, Northern Territory, Queensland, South Australia, Tasmania, Victoria, and Western Australia.

It provides training courses, conferences, a newsletter, and a directory of available indexers.

History
ANZSI was established as the Australian Society of Indexers (AusSI) in Melbourne in 1976 to replace the Society of Indexers in Australia, members of the UK Society of Indexers in Australia. Its early history was recorded by Hazel Bell.

Affiliation with other indexing societies
ANZSI is affiliated with indexing societies in the UK, the United States, Canada, Southern Africa, and China; and associated with societies in Germany (DNI) and the Netherlands (NIN).

Awards
ANZSI medals and highly commended certificates are offered annually for an outstanding index to a book or periodical compiled in Australia or New Zealand. Medals and certificates are not awarded every year.

ANZSI (then AusSI) was the first indexing society in the world to recognise web indexing with an award.

Publications
The ANZSI Newsletter is published 11 times per year. In addition, ANZSI members are regular contributors to the international journal, The Indexer, and ANZSI events are documented in the 'Around the World' section of every issue. Special contributions include articles on Australian topics such as the indexing of Australian Aboriginal personal names, and AusSI (now ANZSI) guest-edited the April 2001 issue. 
In the Index Series, ANZSI publishes indexes which have been created under the ANZSI Mentoring Scheme, in which mentees create indexes to published, but previously un-indexed works.

References

External links
 ]

Index (publishing)
Professional associations based in New Zealand
Professional associations based in Australia